Svenkoeltzia is a genus of flowering plants from the orchid family, Orchidaceae. It contains three known species, all endemic to Mexico.

Svenkoeltzia congestiflora (L.O.Williams) Burns-Bal. - Oaxaca
Svenkoeltzia luzmariana R.González - Jalisco
Svenkoeltzia patriciae R.González - Jalisco

A fourth species, Svenkoeltzia pamelae Szlach., Rutk. & Mytnik, was described from Oaxaca in 2004, but the name is considered not validly published because the authors did not specify the herbarium in which the type specimen is located. The Kew World Checklist and the Plant List list the name as a synonym of S. congestiflora.

See also 
 List of Orchidaceae genera

References

External links 

Orchids of Mexico
Cranichideae genera
Spiranthinae